Gustavo Zanatta Gasperín (born 28 January 1951) is a Mexican politician affiliated with the Institutional Revolutionary Party. As of 2014 he served as Deputy of the LIX Legislature of the Mexican Congress representing Oaxaca as replacement of Eviel Pérez Magaña.

References

1951 births
Living people
People from Oaxaca
Institutional Revolutionary Party politicians
Deputies of the LIX Legislature of Mexico
Members of the Chamber of Deputies (Mexico) for Oaxaca